For about a hundred years, from after Reconstruction until the 1990s, the Democratic Party dominated Texas politics, making part of the Solid South. In a reversal of alignments, since the late 1960s, the Republican Party has grown more prominent. By the 1990s, it became the state's dominant political party and remains so to this day, as Democrats have not won a statewide race since the 1994 Lieutenant gubernatorial election.  

Texas is a majority Republican state with Republicans controlling every statewide office. Texas Republicans have majorities in the State House and Senate, an entirely Republican Texas Supreme Court, control of both Senate seats in the US Congress. Texas is America's most-populous Republican state. Many commentators had suggested that Texas is trending Democratic since 2016, however, Republicans have continued to win every statewide office by double digit margins in 2022.

The 19th-century culture of the state was heavily influenced by the plantation culture of the Old South, dependent on African-American slaves, as well as the patron system once prevalent (and still somewhat present) in northern Mexico and South Texas. In these societies the government's primary role was seen as being the preservation of social order. Solving of individual problems in society was seen as a local problem with the expectation that the individual with wealth should resolve his or her own issues. These influences continue to affect Texas today. In their book, Texas Politics Today 2009-2010, authors Maxwell, Crain, and Santos attribute Texas' traditionally low voter turnout among whites to these influences. But beginning in the early 20th century, voter turnout was dramatically reduced by the state legislature's disenfranchisement of most blacks, and many poor whites and Latinos.

History

Democratic dominance: 1845 to Mid 1990s
From 1848 until Dwight D. Eisenhower's victory in 1952, Texas voted for the Democratic candidate for president in every election except 1928, when it did not support Catholic Al Smith. The Democrats were pro-slavery pre-Civil War, as Abraham Lincoln was a Republican in the North. Most Republicans were Abolitionists. In the mid-20th century 1952 and 1956 elections, the state voters joined the landslide for Dwight D. Eisenhower. (Texas did not vote in 1864 and 1868 due to the Civil War and Reconstruction).

In the post-Civil War era, two of the most important Republican figures in Texas were African Americans George T. Ruby and Norris Wright Cuney. Ruby was a black community organizer, director in the federal Freedmen's Bureau, and leader of the Galveston Union League. His protégé Cuney was a person of mixed-race descent whose wealthy, white planter father freed him and his siblings before the Civil War and arranged for his education in Pennsylvania. Cuney returned and settled in Galveston, where he became active in the Union League and the Republican party; he rose to the leadership of the party. He became influential in Galveston and Texas politics, and is widely regarded as one of the most influential black leaders in the South during the 19th century.

From 1902 through 1965, Texas had virtually disenfranchised most Black, many Latino, and poor white people through the imposition of the poll tax and white primaries. Across the South, Democrats controlled congressional apportionment based on total population, although they had disenfranchised the black population. The Solid South exercised tremendous power in Congress, and Democrats gained important committee chairmanships by seniority. They gained federal funding for infrastructure projects in their states and the region, as well as support for numerous military bases, as two examples of how they brought federal investment to the state and region.

In the post-Reconstruction era, by the late 19th and early 20th centuries, the Republican Party became non-competitive in the South, due to Democrat-dominated legislatures' disenfranchisement of blacks and many poor whites and Latinos. In Texas, the Democrat-dominated legislature excluded them through passage of a poll tax and white primary. Voter turnout in Texas declined dramatically following these disenfranchisement measures, and Southern voting turnout was far below the national average.

Although black people made up 20 percent of the state population at the turn of the century, they were essentially excluded from formal politics. Republican support in Texas had been based almost exclusively in the free black communities, particularly in Galveston, and in the German counties of the rural Texas Hill Country inhabited by German immigrants and their descendants, who had opposed slavery in the antebellum period. The German counties continued to run Republican candidates. Harry M. Wurzbach was elected from the 14th district from 1920 to 1926, contesting and finally winning the election of 1928, and being re-elected in 1930.

Some of the most important American political figures of the 20th century, such as President Lyndon B. Johnson, Vice-President John Nance Garner, Speaker of the House Sam Rayburn, and Senator Ralph Yarborough were Texas Democrats. But, the Texas Democrats were rarely united, being divided into conservative, moderate and liberal factions that vied with one another for power.

Increasing Republican strength: 1960 to 1990

Beginning in the late 1960s, Republican strength increased in Texas, particularly among residents of the expanding "country club suburbs" around Dallas and Houston. The election, to Congress, of Republicans such as John Tower, (who had switched from the Democratic Party) and George H. W. Bush in 1961 and 1966, respectively, reflected this trend. Nationally, outside of the South, Democrats supported the civil rights movement and achieved important passage of federal legislation in the mid-1960s. In the South, however, Democratic leaders had opposed changes to bring about black voting or desegregated schools and public facilities and in many places exercised resistance. Following the passage of the Civil Rights Act of 1964, southern white voters began to align with the Republican Party, a movement accelerated after the next year, when Congress passed the Voting Rights Act of 1965, providing for federal enforcement of minorities' constitutional right to vote. Voter registration and turnout increased among blacks and Latinos in Texas and other states.

Unlike the rest of the South, however, Texas voters were never especially supportive of the various third-party candidacies of Southern Democrats. It was the only state in the former Confederacy to back Democrat Hubert Humphrey in the 1968 presidential election. During the 1980s, a number of conservative Democrats defected to the GOP, including Senator Phil Gramm, Congressman Kent Hance, and GOP Governor Rick Perry, who was a Democrat during his time as a state lawmaker.

John Tower's 1961 election to the U.S. Senate made him the first statewide GOP officeholder since Reconstruction and the disenfranchisement of black Republicans. Republican Governor Bill Clements and Senator Phil Gramm (also a former Democrat) were elected after him. Republicans became increasingly dominant in national elections in white-majority Texas. The last Democratic presidential candidate to win the state was Jimmy Carter in 1976. In the 1992 election, Bill Clinton became the first Democrat to win the Oval Office while losing Texas electoral votes. This result significantly reduced the power of Texas Democrats at the national level, as party leaders believed the state had become unwinnable.

Republican dominance: Mid 1990s to Present

Despite increasing Republican strength in national elections, after the 1990 census, Texas Democrats still controlled both houses of the State Legislature and most statewide offices. As a result, they directed the redistricting process after the decennial census. Although Congressional Texas Democrats received an average of 45 percent of the votes, Democrats consistently had a majority in the state delegation, as they had in every election since at least the end of Reconstruction.

In 1994, Democratic Governor Ann Richards lost her bid for re-election against Republican George W. Bush, ending an era in which Democrats controlled the governorship for all but eight of the past 120 years. Republicans have won the governorship ever since. In 1998, Bush won re-election in a landslide victory, with Republicans sweeping to victory in all the statewide races. Republicans won the Texas Senate for the first time since Reconstruction in 1996. 

After the 2000 census, the Republican-controlled state Senate sought to draw a congressional district map that would guarantee a Republican majority in the state's delegation.  The Democrat-controlled state House desired to retain a plan similar to the existing lines. There was an impasse. With the Legislature unable to reach a compromise, the matter was settled by a panel of federal court judges, who ruled in favor of a district map that largely retained the status quo.

But, Republicans dominated the Legislative Redistricting Board, which defines the state legislative districts, by a majority of four to one. The Republicans on this board used their voting strength to adopt a map for the state Senate that was more favorable to the Republicans as well as a map for the state House that also strongly favored them, as Democrats had also done before them.

In 2002, Texas Republicans gained control of the Texas House of Representatives for the first time since Reconstruction. The newly elected Republican legislature engaged in an unprecedented mid-decade redistricting plan. Democrats said that the redistricting was a blatant partisan gerrymander, while Republicans argued that it was a much-needed correction of the partisan lines drawn after the 1990 census. But, the Republicans ignored the effects of nearly one million new citizens in the state, basing redistricting on 2000 census data. The result was a gain of six seats by the Republicans in the 2004 elections, giving them a majority of the state's delegation for the first time since Reconstruction.

In December 2005, the US Supreme Court agreed to hear an appeal that challenged the legality of this redistricting plan.  While largely upholding the map, it ruled the El Paso-to-San Antonio 23rd District, which had been a protected majority-Latino district until the 2003 redistricting, was unconstitutionally drawn.  The ruling forced nearly every district in the El Paso-San Antonio corridor to be reconfigured.  Partly due to this, Democrats picked up two seats in the state in the 2006 elections. The 23rd's Republican incumbent was defeated in this election. It was the first time a Democratic House challenger unseated a Texas Republican incumbent in 10 years.

In 2018, Democratic Congressman Beto O'Rourke lost his Senate bid to the incumbent Ted Cruz by 2.6%, the best result for a Democratic Senate candidate since Lloyd Bentsen won in 1988. O'Rourke's performance in 2018 led analysts to predict greater gains for the Democrats going into the 2020s. In the 2020 elections, Texas voted for the Republican nominee for president Donald Trump by a narrower margin than in 2016, and re-elected the Republican incumbent senator, John Cornyn. In the 2022 governor race, the Republican governor Greg Abbott easily won reelection against Beto O'Rourke.

Issues

Capital punishment

Texas has a reputation for strict "law and order" sentencing. Texas leads the nation in executions, with 464 executions from 1974 to 2011. The second-highest ranking state is Virginia, with 108.  A 2002 Houston Chronicle poll of Texans found that when asked "Do you support the death penalty?" 69.1% responded that they did, 21.9% did not support and 9.1% were not sure or gave no answer.

Secessionist sentiment

Texas has a long history with secession. It was originally a Spanish province, which in 1821 seceded from Spain and helped form the First Mexican Empire. In 1824 Texas became a state in the new Mexican republic. In 1835 Antonio López de Santa Anna assumed dictatorial control over that republic and several states openly rebelled against the changes: Coahuila y Tejas (the northern part of which would become the Republic of Texas), San Luis Potosí, Querétaro, Durango, Guanajuato, Michoacán, Yucatán, Jalisco, Nuevo León, Tamaulipas, and Zacatecas. Several of these states formed their own governments: the Republic of the Rio Grande, the Republic of Yucatan, and the Republic of Texas. Only the Texans defeated Santa Anna and retained their independence.
Some Texans believe that because it joined the United States as a country, the Texas state constitution includes the right to secede.  However, neither the ordinance of The Texas Annexation of 1845 nor The Annexation of Texas Joint Resolution of Congress March 1, 1845 included provisions giving Texas the right to secede. Texas did originally retain the right to divide into as many as five independent States, and as part of the Compromise of 1850 continues to retain that right while ceding former claims westward and northward along the full length of the Rio Grande in exchange for $10 million from the federal government. See Texas divisionism.

The United States Supreme Court's primary ruling on the legality of secession involved a case brought by Texas involving a Civil War era bonds transfer.  In deciding the 1869 Texas v. White case, the Supreme Court first addressed the issue of whether Texas had in fact seceded when it joined the Confederacy.  In a 5–3 vote the Court "held that as a matter of constitutional law, no state could leave the Union, explicitly repudiating the position of the Confederate States that the United States was a voluntary compact between sovereign states."  In writing the majority opinion Chief Justice Salmon Chase opined that:
When, therefore, Texas became one of the United States, she entered into an indissoluble relation. All the obligations of perpetual union, and all the guaranties of republican government in the Union, attached at once to the State. The act which consummated her admission into the Union was something more than a compact; it was the incorporation of a new member into the political body. And it was final. The union between Texas and the other States was as complete, as perpetual, and as indissoluble as the union between the original States. There was no place for reconsideration or revocation, except through revolution or through consent of the States. 

However, as the issue of secession per se was not the one before the court, it has been debated as to whether this reasoning is merely dicta or a binding ruling on the question. It is also worth noting that Salmon Chase was nominated by Abraham Lincoln and was a staunch anti-secessionist. It is unlikely that he or his Republican appointed court would have approved of the Confederacy and Texas' choice to join it.

The state's organized secessionist movement is growing, with a notable minority of Texans holding secessionist sentiments.  A 2009 poll found that 31% of Texans believe that Texas has the legal right to secede and form an independent country and 18% believe it should do so. The Texas Nationalist Movement has been working towards Texas independence for 15 years.  In January, 2021 State Representative Kyle Biedermann filed HB 1359, which would bring a vote for Texas independence to the citizens of Texas in November 2021.

Budget
Until 2010, Texas had weathered the Great Recession fairly well, buffered by its vast oil and gas industries. It avoided the housing industry meltdown and its unemployment rate continues to be below the national level. It benefited from having a two-year budget cycle, allowing officials create budget plans with more time to focus on issues of importance. However, Texas was impacted by the economic downturn just like many other states, and by 2011 was suffering from tens of billions of dollars in budget deficits.  In order to deal with this deficit, a supermajority of Republicans led to a massive cost cutting spree.  In order to draw new businesses to the state, Texas has developed a program of tax incentives to corporations willing to move there.  These efforts, along with Texas focusing on developing their natural energy resources, has led to a surplus as Texas begins its next two year budget cycle.

Major revenue sources
For FY 2011, the top Texas revenue sources by category were approximately:
Federal Income: 
$42,159,665,863.56
Sales Tax: 
$21,523,984,733.17
Investments: 
$10,406,151,499.48
Other Revenue: 
$8,569,805,443.66
Licenses, Fees, Fines and Penalties: 
$7,741,880,095.57

As of 2008, Texas residents paid a total of $88,794 million dollars in income taxes.  This does not include Federal taxes paid by Texas businesses.

Besides sales tax, other taxes include franchise, insurance, natural gas, alcohol, cigarette and tobacco taxes. Texas has no personal state income tax.

Major spending categories
For FY 2011, the top Texas State Agency spending categories were approximately:
Public Assistance Payments: 
$26,501,123,478.54
Intergovernmental Payments: 
$21,014,819,852.52
Interfund Transfers/Other: 
$12,319,487,032.40
Salaries and Wages: 
$8,595,912,992.82
Employee Benefits: 
$5,743,905,057.61

Current state political parties
 Republican Party of Texas (State Affiliate of Republican Party)
 Texas Democratic Party (State Affiliate of Democratic Party)
 Libertarian Party of Texas (State Affiliate of Libertarian Party)
 Constitution Party of Texas (State Affiliate of Constitution Party)
 Texas Independence Party (State Affiliate of Independence Party of America)
 Green Party of Texas (State Affiliate of Green Party of the United States)
 Reform Party of Texas (State Affiliate of Reform Party of the United States of America)
 Socialist Party of Texas (State Affiliate of Socialist Party USA)
 Communist Party of Texas (State Affiliate of Communist Party of the United States of America)
 Southern Independence Party (State Specific)
 Confederate Party of Texas (state Specific)

Texas's Federal Representation
Texas currently has 38 House districts In the 118th Congress, 13 of Texas's seats are held by Democrats and 25 are held by Republicans. There are as follows:

Texas's 1st congressional district represented by Nathaniel Moran (R)
Texas's 2nd congressional district represented by Dan Crenshaw (R)
Texas's 3rd congressional district represented by Keith Self (R)
Texas's 4th congressional district represented by Pat Fallon (R)
Texas's 5th congressional district represented by Lance Gooden (R)
Texas's 6th congressional district represented by Jake Ellzey (R)
Texas's 7th congressional district represented by Lizzie Fletcher (D)
Texas's 8th congressional district represented by Morgan Luttrell (R)
Texas's 9th congressional district represented by Al Green (D)
Texas's 10th congressional district represented by Michael Cloud (R)
Texas's 11th congressional district represented by August Pfluger (R)
Texas's 12th congressional district represented by Kay Granger (R)
Texas's 13th congressional district represented by Ronny Jackson (R)
Texas's 14th congressional district represented by Randy Weber (R)
Texas's 15th congressional district represented by Monica De La Cruz (R)
Texas's 16th congressional district represented by Veronica Escobar (D)
Texas's 17th congressional district represented by Pete Sessions (R)
Texas's 18th congressional district represented by Sheila Jackson Lee (D)
Texas's 19th congressional district represented by Jodey Arrington (R)
Texas's 20th congressional district represented by Joaquin Castro (D)
Texas's 21st congressional district represented by Chip Roy (R)
Texas's 22nd congressional district represented by Troy Nehls (R)
Texas's 23rd congressional district represented by Tony Gonzales (R)
Texas's 24th congressional district represented by Beth Van Duyne (R)
Texas's 25th congressional district represented by Roger Williams (R)
Texas's 26th congressional district represented by Michael Burgess (R)
Texas's 27th congressional district represented by Michael Cloud (R)
Texas's 28th congressional district represented by Henry Cuellar (D)
Texas's 29th congressional district represented by Sylvia Garcia (D)
Texas's 20th congressional district represented by Jasmine Crockett (D)
Texas's 31st congressional district represented by John Carter (R)
Texas's 32nd congressional district represented by Colin Allred (D)
Texas's 33rd congressional district represented by Mark Veasey (D)
Texas's 34th congressional district represented by Vicente Gonzalez (D)
Texas's 35th congressional district represented by Greg Casar (D)
Texas's 36th congressional district represented by Brian Babin (R)
Texas's 37th congressional district represented by Lloyd Doggett (D)
Texas's 38th congressional district represented by Wesley Hunt (R)

Texas's two United States Senators are Republicans John Cornyn and Ted Cruz, serving since 2002 and 2013, respectively. 

Texas is part of the United States District Court for the Western District of Texas, the United States District Court for the Southern District of Texas, the United States District Court for the Eastern District of Texas, and the United States District Court for the Northern District of Texas in the federal judiciary. The district's cases are appealed to the Houston-based United States Court of Appeals for the Fifth Circuit.

See also
 Government of Texas
 Political party strength in Texas
 Elections in Texas

Notes

References
 Cunningham, Sean P. Cowboy Conservatism: Texas and the Rise of the Modern Right. (2010).

External links
Texas Politics, the TxP project at the University of Texas at Austin